Acantharctia metaleuca is a moth of the family Erebidae. It was described by George Hampson in 1901. It is found in the Democratic Republic of the Congo, Kenya, Nigeria, Sudan and Uganda.

References 

Moths described in 1901
Spilosomina
Moths of Africa